Zhao Chenggu (December 11, 1885 – August 6, 1966) was a Chinese chemist. He was a member of the Chinese Academy of Sciences.

References 

1885 births
1966 deaths
Members of the Chinese Academy of Sciences